The Wheeler–Lea Act of 1938 is a United States federal law that amended Section 5 of the Federal Trade Commission Act to proscribe "unfair or deceptive acts or practices" as well as "unfair methods of competition." It provided civil penalties for violations of Section 5 orders. It also added a clause to Section 5 that stated "unfair or deceptive acts or practices in commerce are hereby declared unlawful" to the Section 5 prohibition of unfair methods of competition in order to protect consumers as well as competition.

Until this amendment was passed, the Federal Trade Commission could only restrict practices that were unfair to competitors. This broadened the FTC's powers to include protection for consumers from false advertising practices.

References

1938 in law
United States federal trade legislation
Advertising in the United States